Rabinovich or Rabinovitch  (Рабино́вич, רבינוביץ), is a Russian Ashkenazi Jewish surname, Slavic for "son of the rabbi" or "son of Rabin". The Polish/Lithuanian equivalents are Rabinowitz or Rabinowicz.

People
People bearing the surname include:
Abraham Rabinovich, American historian and journalist
Abram Rabinovich (1878–1943), Russian chess player
Adolphe Rabinovitch (1918–1944), American Special Operations Executive agent executed by the Germans in World War II
 Birth name of Aharon Yariv  ( 1920 – 1994), Israeli general and politician
Alexandre Rabinovitch-Barakovsky (born 1945), Russian-born composer
Aviva Rabinovich (1927-2007),  professor of botany, chief scientist at the Israel Nature and Parks Authority, environmental activist.
Baruch Yehoshua Yerachmiel Rabinovich (1913–1999), Chassidic Rabbi
Daniel Rabinovich (1943–2015), Argentine musician and humorist, founding member of Les Luthiers
Dina Rabinovitch (1963–2007), British journalist and writer 
Gérard Rabinovitch, French philosopher and sociologist
Frida Schahar-Rabinovich (born 1950), Israeli chess master
Ilya Rabinovich (1891–1942), Russian chess player
Itamar Rabinovich (born 1942), Israeli politician and president of Tel Aviv University
Jack Rabinovitch (1930-2017), Canadian philanthropist
Mikhail Rabinovich (born 1941), Russian-American scientist
Moshe Leib Rabinovich (born 1940), Munkacs Rebbe
Nahum Rabinovich (1928-2020), Israeli rabbi
Robert Rabinovitch, (born 1943), Canadian public servant
Roman Rabinovich, Israeli pianist
Samuel Rabinovich (1909–1988), Soviet radiolocation engineer
Samuel Rabinovitch, (1903–1991), British sculptor, artist, singer and wrestler (also known as Sam Rabin)
Sholem Aleichem (born Sholem Yakov/Solomon Naumovich Rabinovich) (1859–1916), Russian-Ukrainian Yiddish writer
Vadim Rabinovich (born 1953), Ukrainian gangman and godfather
Victor Rabinovitch, Canadian public servant

Fictional characters
 Rabbi Emanuel Rabinovich, non-existent figure cited in antisemitic works
 Russian jokes § Rabinovich, stereotypical Russian Jew

See also 
 Rabinowitz
 Rabin
 Rabinow (surname)

Russian-Jewish surnames
Slavic-language surnames
East Slavic-language surnames
Russian-language surnames
Yiddish-language surnames